Abdolabad (also Romanized as ‘Abdolābād; also known as Abdollāhābād) is a village in Sharifabad Rural District, Sharifabad District, Pakdasht County, Tehran Province, Iran. At the 2006 census, its population was 403, in 99 families.

References 

Populated places in Pakdasht County